The Li River or Li Jiang is the name for the upper reaches of the Gui River in northwestern Guangxi, China. It is part of the Xijiang River system in the Pearl River Basin The river flows  from Xing'an County to Pingle County, where the karst mountains and river sights highlight the famous Li River cruise.

Background
The Li River originates in the Mao'er Mountains in Xing'an County and flows in the general southern direction through Guilin, Yangshuo and Pingle. In Pingle the Li River merges with the Lipu River and the Gongcheng River and continues south as the Gui River, which falls into the Xi Jiang, the western tributary of the Pearl River, in Wuzhou. 

The upper course of the Li River is connected by the ancient Lingqu Canal with the Xiang River, which flows north into the Yangtze; this in the past made the Li and Gui Rivers part of a highly important waterway connecting the Yangtze Valley with the Pearl River Delta.

The  course of the Li and Gui Rivers is flanked by green hills. Cormorant fishing is often associated with the Lijiang (see bird intelligence).

Li River cruises from Guilin to Yangshuo are famous, attracting millions of visitors a year.

Geology

The Li River and tributaries drain the area from Guilin to Yangshuo, descending from 141 m at Guilin to 103 m at Yangshuo. Mean flow past Guilin is 215 cubic metre per second, and alluvium sediments consisting of well sorted gravels covered by silty sand, form floodplains and terraces along its route.  Yet, it is the 2,600 m of Devonian and Carboniferous limestones and karst terrain within the Guilin Basin, that gives the area a dramatic landscape.  Two distinctive types of karst are found, Fengcong, and Fenglin, which have evolved for the past 10-20 million years, within the Cenozoic.

Fengcong karst dominates the course of the Li River and is defined as a group of limestone hills with a common limestone base, with deep depressions or dolines between the peaks, and sometimes described as peak cluster depression karst.  Hundreds of caves are present in this terrain, with 23 having passages longer than -1 km alongside the Li River gorge.  The longest is the Guanyan Cave System which extends from Caoping to Nanxu.

Fenglin dominates the area around Yangshuo and south of Guilin and is defined as isolated limestone hills separated by a flat limestone surface generally covered by loose sediments, and sometimes described as a peak forest plain. The best-known fenglin is the tower karst around Yangshuo.  These towers consist of strong and massive limestone forming near vertical sides with base diameters less than 1.5 times their height.  The heights of the towers range from 30 to 80 m in the central basin but can be as high as 300 m near the Fengcong.  Fenglin evolves from Fengcong by slow and continuous tectonic uplift, associated with the Himalayan orogenic zone, and even slower erosion of the towers.

Famous Show caves in the Guilin area include Qixing Dong and Luti Dong.

Notable features

Reed Flute Cave: a limestone cave with a large number of stalactites, stalagmites, stalacto-stalagmites, rocky curtains, and cave corals.
Seven-Star Park: the largest park in Guilin.
Mountain of Splendid Hues: a mountain consisting of many layers of variously colored rocks.
Elephant-Trunk Hill: a hill that looks like a giant elephant drinking water with its trunk. It is a symbol of the city of Guilin.
Lingqu Canal: dug in 214 BC, is one of ancient China's three big water conservation projects and the oldest existing canal in the world.
Other attractions include Duxiu Peak, Nanxi Park, the Taohua River, the Giant Banyan, and the Huashan-Lijiang National Folklore Park.

The imagery of the Li River is featured in the fifth series of the 20 yuan note.

Gallery

See also
 Geography of China
 List of rivers in China

References

 

Rivers of Guangxi
Tributaries of the Pearl River (China)
Tourist attractions in Guangxi
AAAAA-rated tourist attractions